The table tennis competition at the 1996 Summer Olympics consisted of four events.

Participating nations
A total of 166 athletes (85 men and 81 women), representing 51 NOCs, competed in four events.

Medal table

Medal summary

References

Sources
 Official Olympic Report
 International Table Tennis Federation (ITTF)
 

 
1996 Summer Olympics events
1996
1996 in table tennis